South East United FC is an Australian football club based in the Sorell, Tasmania that plays in the third tier Southern Championship.

Club information
South East United was formed in 2013 at a meeting of representatives from Dodges Ferry Junior Soccer Club, Richmond United, Cambridge United, Peninsula Pirates, Football Federation Tasmania, Eastern Region Junior Soccer Association, Sorell Council, Pembroke Park Management Committee, and Sorell Community Bank.  The club plays out of Pembroke Park.

It has a range of teams from U12 and up of both genders playing in competitions run by the Football Federation Tasmania. Its teams range from juniors right through to seniors, with their senior team playing in the third-tier Southern Championship.

Seasons - Men

References

Association football clubs established in 2013
Soccer clubs in Tasmania
2013 establishments in Australia